Nigel Marlin Balchin (3 December 1908 – 17 May 1970) was an English psychologist and author, particularly known for his novels written during and immediately after World War II: Darkness Falls from the Air, The Small Back Room and Mine Own Executioner.

Life
Balchin was born on 3 December 1908 in Potterne, Wiltshire, the third and last child of William Edwin Balchin (1872–1958), a baker and teashop proprietor, later grocer, and Ada (née Curtis), the daughter of a railway guard. His paternal grandfather, George Marlin Balchin (1830–1898), was a farmer of 800 acres from a long line of wealthy Surrey farmers in Milford. George Balchin moved during the 1870s to Reading to become a Storekeeper. but his sudden decision in 1887 to cease work on his farm had a negative impact on the Balchin family's subsequent finances.

At the age of eighteen months, Balchin knocked over a kettle of scalding water, and was so badly burned that he was not expected to survive. He was educated at Dauntsey's School and Peterhouse, Cambridge, where he took a scholarship and became a Prizeman in Natural Sciences. He then worked for the National Institute of Industrial Psychology between 1930 and 1935. For part of this time he was a consultant to JS Rowntree & Sons, where he was involved in the design and marketing of Black Magic chocolates and, he claimed, responsible for the success of the company's Aero and Kit Kat brands.

During World War II he was a civil servant at the Ministry of Food, and then, on the basis of his pioneering work on personnel selection and scientific research, using early computers, appointed Deputy Scientific Adviser to the Army Council, being promoted to the rank of brigadier at the early age of thirty-six, and through the film of his semi-autobiographical novel The Small Back Room, became regarded as a protypical Boffin. On 29 October 1954, he was the celebrity castaway on Desert Island Discs. In 1956, he moved abroad to write screenplays in Hollywood, Italy and elsewhere, but was increasingly troubled by alcoholism, and returned permanently to England in 1962.

Family

Balchin was married twice.

Firstly, on 21 January 1933 at Chelsea, to Elisabeth Evelyn Walshe (1910-1991), daughter of the novelist Douglas Walshe, whom he had met at Cambridge where she was reading English, archaeology and anthropology at Newnham. Their children were:
Prudence Ann Balchin (1934–2004), who married Z-Cars scriptwriter John Hopkins (1931–1998) and ran a zoo for many years.
Penelope Jane Balchin (born 1937), better known as childcare expert Dr Penelope Leach, who married the science journalist Gerald Leach (1933–2004).
Freja Mary Balchin (born 1944), who became the first female president of Cambridge University's theatre group and married Professor Richard Gregory (1923–2010), a psychologist.

His first marriage broke up following a partner-swapping arrangement between the Balchins, the artist Michael Ayrton and the latter's partner Joan. Elisabeth also had an affair with the composer Christian Darnton. Balchin divorced Elisabeth in 1951 and she married Ayrton a year later. Balchin included an unflattering caricature of Darnton as the poet Stephen Ryle in his novel Darkness Falls from the Air (1942).

Secondly, in February 1953 at Marylebone, he married Yovanka (later Jane) Zorana Tomich. They had two children:
Charles Zoran Marlin Balchin (born 1955), who held senior roles at the BBC, Sky Sports and various overseas broadcasters.
Cassandra Marlin Balchin (1962–2012), an authority on women's rights under Islamic law.

He died on 17 May 1970 at a nursing home in Hampstead, London, and is buried on the edge of the north path in Hampstead Cemetery in north London. His gravestone is small, but distinctive, having the form of an open book.

Ancestors

Writing
Balchin wrote articles for Punch and The Aeroplane magazine, and published three non-fiction books as Mark Spade.

He also wrote novels under his own name, and enjoyed great popular success for a time. Darkness Falls from the Air is set during the London Blitz and was written while the bombing was still in progress. The Small Back Room became a Powell and Pressburger film of the same title. A Way Through the Wood was adapted as a stage play, Waiting for Gillian, and as the 2005 film Separate Lies, which marked the directorial debut of Oscar-winning screenwriter Julian Fellowes. Other critically acclaimed Balchin novels include A Sort of Traitors, Sundry Creditors, The Fall of the Sparrow and Seen Dimly before Dawn.

As a screenwriter he worked on an early draft of Cleopatra but is principally remembered for The Man Who Never Was, for which he won the 1957 BAFTA Award for Best British Screenplay, and Mandy, the story of a deaf child. He also wrote the screenplay for The Singer Not the Song and adapted two of his own novels for the screen.

Bibliography

Magazine Articles by Nigel Balchin

Non-Fiction Books by Mark Spade

Novels by Nigel Balchin

made into the 1948 film, The Small Back Room

made into the 1947 film, Mine Own Executioner

made into the 1960 film, Suspect

made into the 1954 stage play, Waiting for Gillian, and the 2005 film, Separate Lies

Screenplays by Nigel Balchin
  
  
  
  
  
  (written for TV) 
  
  
  
  
  
  
  
  
  
  (written for TV)
  
  (written for TV)

Miscellaneous

 
 
 

 
 
 an anthology including God and the Machine by Nigel Balchin

References

Further biographical reading

External links

The Nigel Marlin Balchin website, operated by Derek Collett
Balchin Family History Society website
Generals of World War II

1908 births
1970 deaths
British Army brigadiers
Military personnel from Wiltshire
British Army brigadiers of World War II
Alumni of Peterhouse, Cambridge
People from Wiltshire
People educated at Dauntsey's School
Burials at Hampstead Cemetery
English psychologists
20th-century British psychologists
British civil servants
20th-century British non-fiction writers
20th-century English novelists
English male screenwriters
20th-century English screenwriters
Best British Screenplay BAFTA Award winners
 
 
 
20th-century English male writers
British Army officers